Emily's Runaway Imagination is a children's novel by American writer Beverly Cleary, first published in 1961. Set in the 1920s, the plot revolves around the experiences of a young, imaginative girl named Emily.

Plot
Emily is a young girl noteworthy throughout her hometown of Pitchfork, Oregon for her great imagination and for the predicaments that she inadvertently manages to create, such as by intoxicating her father's pigs by feeding them rotten apples in order to avoid a chiding from her mother for wasting food, using Clorox to bleach a plow horse white in order to impress a visiting cousin, and humiliating herself publicly by correcting the language of a Chinese neighbor after he mispronounces the name of her pet collie.

Novels by Beverly Cleary
1961 American novels
Novels set in Oregon
William Morrow and Company books
Novels set in the 1920s
1961 children's books